The Offences against Customs or Excise Act of 1745 (19 Geo. 2 c. 34) was a statute in English law, specifying severe punishment for smugglers and their helpers under certain conditions, with financial inducements to bring them to justice.

Description
The long title of the Act was: 

The Statute of 1745 is considered the leading statute for smuggling law in 18th-century England as it makes the greatest effort to convict offenders and to sentence those convicted to death. This statute, part of the Bloody Code, further extended the means by which a person could be convicted for smuggling and put to death without benefit of clergy. As the smuggling war continued to burden Parliament in 18th-century England, it became even more crucial to find ways to convict criminals. There were other measures outside death such as the lesser penalty of transportation. This option was available for the lesser crimes, and comparatively few smugglers were actually convicted and even fewer sentenced to death.

This statute aimed to put more pressure on those who would defy the law and bring unlawful goods, weapons, etc. into the country. The act mentions so called confederacies of persons with firearms that guarded, aided, and assisted in smuggling illegal or unregulated goods into or out of the country. Persons could be charged under the statute by merely being assembled in a group of three or more persons with firearms gathered with the intent of smuggling. Other items in the statute would also state that any person caught smuggling who wore a mask, blackened their face, or even went in disguise could be tried and hanged. The statute could also be used against illegal exportation, mainly of wool, which was considered highly valuable to the economy at that time.

The killing of an excise official was considered especially serious under the statute. After a conviction was made, assuming the criminal was still at large, a notice would be published in the London Gazette and proclaimed in the closest marketplace to the scene of the crime, and the convict would then have up to forty days to report to the county gaol or prison. If the accused attempted to escape or flee, they would be put to death without the benefit of the clergy.

In England, conviction under the statute led to the confiscation of the convict's movable possessions. For those convicted of attempting to hide or aid convicted smugglers, the statute called for them to be tried as a felon within one year and for a minimum sentence of seven years, which was customary for most transportation sentences. Should that person attempt to return they would be subject to the death penalty without the benefit of clergy. Also stated in the act was that one hundred pounds would be awarded for every person killed in the course of seizure of illegal goods, wool, etc. If the felon did not report within the forty days, those who apprehended the felon were to be paid a sum of five hundred pounds within a month after the execution.

See also
 List of Acts of the Parliament of Great Britain, 1740–1759

References

Great Britain Acts of Parliament 1745
Smuggling